This is a list of Israel Twenty20 International cricketers.

In April 2018, the ICC decided to grant full Twenty20 International (T20I) status to all its members. Therefore, all Twenty20 matches played between Israel and other ICC members after 1 January 2019 will have T20I status.

This list will comprise all members of the Israel cricket team who have played at least one T20I match. It is initially arranged in the order in which each player won his first Twenty20 cap. Where more than one player will win his first Twenty20 cap in the same match, those players will be listed alphabetically by surname (according to the name format used by Cricinfo).

Israel played their first match with T20I status on 28 June 2022 against Portugal during the 2022–23 ICC Men's T20 World Cup Europe Qualifier.

Key

Players 

Statistics are correct as of 3 July 2022.

References 

Israel
cricket, Twenty20 International